Imrich Bugár (born 14 April 1955) is a Czechoslovak discus thrower. An ethnic Hungarian who represented Czechoslovakia and then the Czech Republic, his career highlights include an Olympic silver medal from 1980, a European Championship title from 1982 and a gold medal in the inaugural World Championships in 1983. His personal best throw of 71.26 metres puts him tenth in the all-time performers list.

Career
He was born in Ohrady near Dunajská Streda, Czechoslovakia, and represented the clubs Inter Bratislava and Dukla Prague. He was very successful in his early career with a bronze medal at the 1978 European Championships in Czechoslovakia, the silver medal at the 1980 Olympic Games, the third place at the 1981 World Cup, the gold medal at the 1982 European Championships and the gold medal at the 1983 World Championships. In 1982 he was awarded as the Sportsperson of the Year in Czechoslovakia.

He finished fourth at the 1986 Goodwill Games, eighth at the 1986 European Championships, seventh at the 1987 World Championships, twelfth at the 1988 Olympic Games, and seventh at the 1990 European Championships. He then competed at the 1991 and 1993 World Championships, the 1992 Olympic Games and the 1994 European Championships without reaching the final. He became Czechoslovak champion in 1978, 1979, 1980, 1981, 1982, 1983, 1984, 1985, 1986, 1988, 1990, 1991 and 1992, and Czech champion in 1993 and 1994. 

His personal best throw was 71.26 metres, achieved in May 1985 in San Jose. This is the Czech record, and puts him tenth in the all-time performers list worldwide.

References

External links 

 
 
 
 

1955 births
Living people
Czechoslovak male discus throwers
Czech male discus throwers
Slovak male discus throwers
Olympic athletes of Czechoslovakia
Olympic silver medalists for Czechoslovakia

Athletes (track and field) at the 1980 Summer Olympics
Athletes (track and field) at the 1988 Summer Olympics
Athletes (track and field) at the 1992 Summer Olympics
Hungarians in Slovakia
People from Dunajská Streda District
World Athletics Championships athletes for Czechoslovakia
World Athletics Championships athletes for the Czech Republic
World Athletics Championships medalists
European Athletics Championships medalists
Medalists at the 1980 Summer Olympics
Olympic silver medalists in athletics (track and field)
World Athletics Championships winners
Competitors at the 1986 Goodwill Games
Sportspeople from the Trnava Region